This is a list of foreign ministers in 1950.

Africa

Asia

Australia and Oceania

Europe

North America and the Caribbean

South America

1950 in international relations
Foreign ministers
1950